The feeble gracile blind snake (Letheobia debilis) is a species of snake in the Typhlopidae family. It is endemic to Africa.

References

Endemic fauna of the Central African Republic
Letheobia
Reptiles described in 1990